Carteris is a genus of litter moths of the family Erebidae.

Species
 Carteris lineata (Druce, 1898)
 Carteris oculatalis (Möschler, 1890) – dotted carteris moth

References

 Carteris at Markku Savela's Lepidoptera and Some Other Life Forms
 Natural History Museum Lepidoptera genus database

Herminiinae
Moth genera